John Gordon "Jack" Lancien (born June 14, 1923 in Regina, Saskatchewan - d. June 7, 1991 in Spokane, Washington) was a professional ice hockey player. He played in 63 NHL games, all with the New York Rangers. He tallied 1 goal and 5 assists in his NHL career.

Professional career
Jack Lancien was a skilled defenceman who played parts of four seasons with the New York Rangers in the 40s and 50s. He was a fine playmaker who could cover people in his own end. He also had a lengthy 15-year career playing in the minors and senior leagues.

Lancien began his career playing junior hockey with the hometown Regina Pats. In 1946–47 he played in one game for the Rangers but otherwise took a regular turn on the New York Rovers' blueline in the Eastern Hockey League. The next year he was recalled for a couple of playoff games then dressed for 43 contests in 1949–50.

After playing 19 games in 1950–51, Lancien returned to the minors where he remained until he retired in 1961. Along the way, some of his most productive years came in the Western Hockey League (minor pro) with the Vancouver Canucks and the senior Spokane Flyers of the Western International Hockey League.

Personal life
At the conclusion of his hockey career, Jack Lancien settled in Spokane, Washington and worked as a Conductor for the Great Northern Railway where he was employed until his retirement. Lancien enjoyed playing golf, and became very skilled on the links with a zero (or scratch) handicap.

Lancien was twice married and had three children, (two daughters and a son) and three grandsons. Lancien died in 1991 at the age of 67 after a battle with cancer.

External links

1923 births
1991 deaths
Canadian ice hockey defencemen
Ice hockey people from Saskatchewan
New York Rangers players
New York Rovers players
Sportspeople from Regina, Saskatchewan
Canadian expatriate ice hockey players in the United States
Conductor (rail)